The 2002 California Attorney General election occurred on November 5, 2002. The primary elections took place on March 5, 2002. The Democratic incumbent, Bill Lockyer, easily defeated the Republican nominee, State Senate Minority Leader Dick Ackerman.

Primary Results

Democratic

Others

Results

Results by county
Results from the Secretary of State of California.

See also
California state elections, 2002
State of California
California Attorney General
List of attorneys general of California

References

External links
VoteCircle.com Non-partisan resources & vote sharing network for Californians
Information on the elections from California's Secretary of State

2002 California elections
2002
California